Live from KCRW is the fourth live album by the Australian rock band Nick Cave and the Bad Seeds. It was released on 29 November 2013 on Bad Seed Ltd. The album features a live radio session recorded for KCRW on 18 April 2013 at Apogee Studio in Los Angeles, California, United States. The session, which featured a stripped-down line-up performing songs from the band's back catalogue and their most recent release, Push the Sky Away (2013), was recorded by Bob Clearmountain.

Live from KCRW was released on CD and double LP, as well as a digital download. The double LP features two exclusive tracks, "Into My Arms" and "God is in the House", which were excluded from previous radio broadcasts of Nick Cave and the Bad Seeds' KCRW session.

Reception

Upon its release, Live from KCRW received largely positive reviews from music critics. At Metacritic, which assigns a normalised rating out of 100 to reviews from mainstream critics, the album received an average score of 77, based on 14 reviews, indicating "generally favorable reviews". AllMusic reviewer Mark Deming noted that the Bad Seeds were "calling up a palette of sounds that range from the spectral to the majestic, and as they accompany [Nick] Cave on a set of his more contemplative material" and called the material "impressive, especially given the one-take nature of the recording." He rated the album three-and-a-half out of five stars. Writing for Drowned in Sound, Matthew Slaughter described how "Cave the balladeer remains a beast, but a beautiful one … every quiver and every declamation reaches deep inside the ear drum, then rests there." Slaughter added that "it's easy to savour Warren Ellis tenor guitar scrapes, Jim Sclavunos simple, effective percussion, Martyn Caseys precise, humming bass and Barry Adamsons ominous organ … as they punctuate the often confused poetry", awarding the album an eight out of ten rating.

In his review for Exclaim!, Vish Khanna said "here [the band] strip down to play mellower fare. That's not to say it's not intense or pensive in its own right; Cave is a master of phrasing and knows how to enhance the suspense and drama in his carefully written lyrics", rating Live from KCRW eight out of ten. Kitty Empire of The Observer wrote that the album "isn't some rip-snorting gallop through perdition, setting Grinch-ish fire to fir trees … it's a classy, dialled-down performance". Awarding the album three out of five stars, Empire selected "Higgs Boson Blues" as Live from KCRWs highlight, referring to it as "a meditation on matters temporal" and "even more spacious here than on [Push the Sky Away]."

A positive review in The Quietus, penned by Julian Marszalek, noted that Live from KCRW "is a fine declaration of where the Bad Seeds are in the here and now … they sound as comfortable in their music as they do the fine suits they wear." Marszalek added that Warren Ellis "has taken the position of Minister of Sinister Noises and his mastery of four-stringed instruments and loops has made an indelible impact on the band", calling his contributions the "breadth of sound that now defines the Bad Seeds." Writing for Pitchfork, Stuart Berman referred to the album as "something of a wild card" among the band's other live albums, further explaining it is "distinguished not just by its loose, casual vibe … but by its welcome variations from the standard Bad Seeds script with a healthy selection of deep cuts that don't get aired out that often."

Track listing

Personnel
All personnel credits adapted from Live from KCRWs liner notes.

Nick Cave and the Bad Seeds
Nick Cave – vocals, piano
Warren Ellis – tenor guitar, violin, piano, loops, backing vocals
Martyn P. Casey – bass
Jim Sclavunos – drums, percussion, backing vocals
Barry Adamson – organ, percussion, backing vocals

Technical personnel
Bob Clearmountain – recording, mixing
Brandon Duncan – recording, mixing assistant
Kevin Paul – additional remixing
Howie Weinberg – mastering
Dan Gerbarg – mastering

Design personnel
Tom Hingston Studio – artwork
Larry Hirshowitz – photography
Andrew Whitton – photography

Charts

Release history

References

External links

2013 live albums
Nick Cave live albums
Bad Seed Ltd albums